Yulchon-myeon, also called Yulchon Township, or shortly Yulchon, is a myeon (township) in Yeosu city of South Jeolla Province, South Korea. The myeon is located in the north-western part of the city. The total area of Yulchon-myeon is 46.5 square kilometers, and, as of the last day of 2010, the population was 7404 people. It has Yeosu Airport in Sinpung-ri. Township hall is located in Johwa-ri. Sora-myeon is to the south and Haeryong-myeon, Suncheon to the north, Gwangyang-eup, Gwangyang is to the north-east, Suncheon Bay and Yeoja Bay to the west, and Gwangyang Bay is to the east.

History 
 1897: Yulchon-myeon, Yeosu-gun, Jeollanam-do
 15 August 1949: Yulchon-myeon, Yeocheon-gun, Jeollanam-do: Yeosu-gun was split into Yeosu-si and Yeocheon-gun.
 1 April 1998: Yulchon-myeon, Yeosu-si, Jeollanam-do: Yeosu-si, Yeocheon-si, and Yeocheon-gun were merged to Yeosu-si.

Ri 
It has ten jurisdictions and thirty seven administrative districts.

Gajang-ri 
Gajang-ri has four administrative districts: Gajang(가장), Nanhwa(난화), Jungsan(중산) and Yeonhwa(연화).

Banwol-ri 
Banwol-ri has two administrative districts: Banwol(반월) and Samsan(삼산).

Bongjeon-ri 
Bongjeon-ri has two administrative districts: Bongjeon(봉전) and Gwangam(광암).

Sansu-ri 
Sansu-ri has three administrative districts: Sansu(산수)1~2 and Bongdu(봉두). It has Yulchon Tunnel on Expo-daero with Yongjeon-ri, Haeryong-myeon, Suncheon.

Sangbong-ri 
Sangbong-ri has two administrative districts: Sangbong(상봉)1~2.

Sinpung-ri 
Sinpung-ri has seven administrative districts:.Sinpung(신풍)1, Guam(구암)1~2, Sinheung(신흥), Deoksan(덕산), Aeyang(애양) and Doseong(도성). It has Yeosu Airport and it had abandoned Sinpung Station. It has Daepo Tunnel on Expo-daero with Daepo-ri, Sora-myeon. It has Sangok Tunnel on Expo-daero with Chwijeok-ri.

Yeodong-ri 
Yeodong-ri has only one administrative districts: Songdo(송도).

Wolsan-ri 
Wolsan-ri has six administrative districts: Cheongsan(청산)1~2 and Wolsan(월산)1~4. It has Chwijeok Tunnel on Expo-daero with Chwijeok-ri. It has Yulchon Intersection on Expo-daero and Seobu-ro.

Johwa-ri 
Johwa-ri has five administrative districts: Johwa(조화) and Yeoheung(여흥)1~4. It has Yulchon township hall and Yulchon Station.

Chwijeok-ri 
Chwijeok-ri has five administrative districts: Chwijeok(취적)1~2, Sinsan(신산)1~3. It has Sangok Tunnel on Expo-daero with Sinpung-ri. It has Chwijeok Tunnel on Expo-daero with Wolsan-ri.

Transport 
It has Yeosu Airport in Sinpung-ri. It has Yulchon station on Jeolla Line in Johwa-ri. Sinpung Station on Jeolla Line in Sinpung-ri was abandoned. The motorway named Expo-daero pass this myeon and it is on National Route 17 and Gukjido 22. Yulchon Intersection on the Expo-daero is in the Wolsan-ri. Seobu-ro and Haeryong-ro is on the Jibangdo 863. Yeosun-ro was the former National Route 17 and Gukjido 22 segment, but it was abolished when the Expo-daero was opened in 2012. Expo-daero pass four jurisdictions: Sinpung-ri, Chwijeok-ri, Wolsan-ri and Sansu-ri. It has four tunnels on Expo-daero: Daepo Tunnel, Sangok Tunnel, Chwijeok Tunnel and Yulchon Tunnel.

References

External links 
  여수시 율촌면사무소

Yeosu
Towns and townships in South Jeolla Province